Dunwich is a town and locality on the western side of North Stradbroke Island in Queensland, Australia. Dunwich is part of the Redland City local government area, administered from the bayside town of Cleveland on the Queensland mainland.

Dunwich is one of three towns on North Stradbroke Island - the others being Amity Point and Point Lookout.

History
Originally known as Goompi and then renamed Green Point by European settlers, the first settlement at Dunwich was established in 1827 as pilot station and military post. It was supposed to be a good place to discharge cargo from visiting ships that traveled through the South Passage. However cargo was lost in bad weather and local Aboriginals were hostile so the post was disbanded in 1831. Dunwich was named after the Suffolk village of Dunwich near to the Stradbroke Estate by Sir Ralph Darling on 16 July 1827, in honour of the family title (Viscount Dunwich) of the Earl of Stradbroke, father of Captain Henry John Rous RN, commander of HMS Rainbow, which carried Governor Darling to Moreton Bay and surveyed the immediate Dunwich area.

Dunwich Provisional School opened on 21 January 1889 as a school for aboriginal children.In 1890-1 it was moved to Bribie Island. In November 1892, it was moved to Peel Island. It was later moved to the new Myora Mission on North Stradbrook Island.

In 1892, a leper colony was established at Dunwich; later this facility was closed and the lepers moved to the Peel Island lazaret. A quarantine station opened in 1850, although this was eventually moved to the more isolated St Helena Island in Moreton Bay. The station was converted into a nursing home for the elderly and infirmed, one of Queensland's first such facilities. The home was moved to Sandgate in 1946. The main cemetery on the island (Dunwich Cemetery) is found in this small town and contains the graves of over 10,000 people, most of which are unmarked. Other small cemeteries were established for the indigenous community and the leper colony.

Dunwich Post Office opened on 22 October 1896 (a receiving office had been open from 1885).

A second Dunwich Provisional School opened on 18 August 1904. On 1 May 1915, it became Dunwich State School.

In 1943, after the closure of the Myora Mission, some of the residents were moved to Dunwich; others went to One Milein Ipswich.

Some of the remaining buildings from the Dunwich Benevolent Asylum now form part of the North Stradbroke Island Historical Museum, located in Welsby Street, Dunwich. The Dunwich Convict Causeway also remains, although it has been expanded to accommodate modern ships.

The 'Aboriginal Gang' that worked the Dunwich Benevolent Asylum were the first Aboriginal people in Australia to receive equal wages. In 1944, after a 25 year campaign, the Aboriginal workers gained equal wages almost 20 years before anywhere else in Australia. The Asylum closed shortly after with the Aboriginal Gang only getting equal wages for one and a half years.

The median age of the Dunwich population was 39 years, 2 years above the national median of 37. 86.2% of people living in Dunwich were born in Australia. The other top responses for country of birth were New Zealand 3.8%, England 2.4%, India 0.7%, France 0.6%, Germany 0.6%. 90.8% of people spoke only English at home; the next most common languages were 0.6% Indonesian, 0.5% Other Australian Indigenous Languages, nec, 0.5% German, 0.5% Yumplatok (Torres Strait Creole).

Heritage listings

Dunwich has a number of heritage-listed sites, including:
 Dunwich Cemetery, Bingle Road
 Dunwich Convict Causeway: Junner Street
 Dunwich Public Reserve, Junner Street
 St Mark's Anglican Church and Dunwich Public Hall: Junner Street

Amenities
The Redland City Council operates a public library in Ballow Road.

Education 
Dunwich State School is a government primary (Prep-6) school for boys and girls at Bingle Road. In 2017, the school had an enrolment of 172 students with 14 teachers (11 full-time equivalent) and 14 non-teaching staff (9 full-time equivalent).  In 2018, the school had an enrolment of 177 students with 15 teachers (12 full-time equivalent) and 15 non-teaching staff (10 full-time equivalent). The school includes a special education program.

There is no secondary school in Dunwich. The nearest government secondary school is Cleveland District State High School in Cleveland on mainland to the south-west.

Transport

There is no bridge to North Stradbroke Island. Vehicular ferries which cross Moreton Bay link the mainland with North Stradbroke Island dock at Dunwich. Mining companies have also extensive barge docking and loading facilities at Dunwich.

See also
 Redland City
 South East Queensland

References

External links

 
 Redlands Tourism

North Stradbroke Island page
State Library of Qld image of Stradbroke Island Benevolent Asylum ca. 1885
Getting Equal: Australia's first successful Aboriginal wages case. John Oxley Library Blog, State Library of Queensland.

 
Coastal towns in Queensland
Populated places established in 1827
Suburbs of Redland City
Towns in Queensland
1827 establishments in Australia
North Stradbroke Island
Localities in Queensland